Spirit is the debut studio album by Swiss folk metal band Eluveitie. It was released on 1 June 2006 by Fear Dark Records and re-released by Twilight Records in 2007.

Track listing

Personnel
 Accordion – Toby Roth
 Accordion [Zugerörgeli (helvetic Accordeon)] – Sarah Wauquiez
 Acoustic Guitar – Chrigel Glanzmann
 Arranged By – Eluveitie
 Artwork By [Booklet] – Chrigel Glanzmann
 Artwork By [Cover] – Ghislaine Ayer
 Artwork By [Front/back Cover] – Travis Smith
 Backing Vocals – Sevan Kirder
 Bagpipes [Gaita] – Sevan Kirder
 Bagpipes [Shepard Pipe] – Chrigel Glanzmann
 Bagpipes [Uilleann Pipes] – Chrigel Glanzmann
 Bass – Rafi Kirder
 Co-producer – Markus Stock, Tobias Schönemann
 Crumhorn – Sarah Wauquiez
 Drums – Merlin Sutter
 Engineer [Acoustic Instruments & Clean Vocals] – Klaus Grimmer
 Engineer [Drums, Guitars, Bass & Vocals] – Markus Stock
 Fiddle – Linda Suter, Meri Tadic
 Flute [Irish Flute] – Sevan Kirder
 Guitar – Ivo Henzi, Simeon Koch
 Hurdy Gurdy – Sarah Wauquiez
 Instruments [Bass-shalm] – Sarah Wauquiez
 Lead Vocals – Chrigel Glanzmann
 Mandolin [Mandola] – Chrigel Glanzmann
 Mastered By – Martijn van Groeneveldt*
 Mixed By – Markus Stock
 Photography [Bandphotograph] – Ghislaine Ayer
 Photography [Groupfoto] – Travis Smith
 Photography [Portraitphotographs] – Christoph Oeschger

Producer – Eluveitie

 Tin Whistle – Chrigel Glanzmann, Sevan Kirder
 Vocals – Linda Suter, Meri Tadic, Sarah Wauquiez
 Vocals [Additional Grunts] – Meri Tadic
 Whistle [Low Whistle] – Chrigel Glanzmann, Sevan Kirder

References

2006 debut albums
Eluveitie albums
Season of Mist albums